The 2002 Dallas Burn season was the seventh season of the Major League Soccer team. The team made the playoffs for the seventh consecutive year.

Final standings

Regular season

Playoffs

Western Conference semifinals

U.S. Open Cup

References

External links
 Season statistics

2002
Dallas Burn
Dallas Burn
Dallas Burn